USS Ellen has been the name of more than one United States Navy ship, and may refer to:
 , a side wheel steamer in commission from 1861 to 1862 and sold in 1865
 , a patrol vessel in service from 1917 until 1918 or 1919
 , later USS SP-1209, a patrol vessel in commission from 1917 to 1919

United States Navy ship names